Robert van Voerst (bapt. 8 December 1597 – before October 1636) was a Dutch engraver.

He was born in Deventer, and studied under Crispin van de Passe. He arrived in England in 1628 and soon afterwards Charles I of England appointed him his royal engraver. He principally reproduced works by Anthony van Dyck, also active in the British court, who gave van Voerst the exclusive commission on reproducing his portraits. He died in London.

Notes

External links

http://www.npg.org.uk/collections/search/person/mp07684/robert-van-voerst
http://www.aucklandartgallery.com/the-collection/browse-artists/7776/robert-van-voerst
http://www.metmuseum.org/collection/the-collection-online/search/424131

1597 births
1636 deaths
Dutch engravers
Dutch expatriates in England
People from Deventer